The 2015–16 Southeast Missouri State Redhawks men's basketball team represented Southeast Missouri State University during the 2015–16 NCAA Division I men's basketball season. The Redhawks, led by first year head coach Rick Ray, played their home games at the Show Me Center and were members of the West Division of the Ohio Valley Conference. They finished the season 5–24, 2–14 in OVC play to finish in last place in the West Division. They failed to qualify for the OVC tournament.

Roster

Schedule

|-
!colspan=9 style="background:#FF0000; color:#000000;"| Exhibition

|-
!colspan=9 style="background:#FF0000; color:#000000;"| Regular season

References

Southeast Missouri State Redhawks men's basketball seasons
Southeast Missouri State
Southeast Missouri State Redhawks men's basketball
Southeast Missouri State Redhawks men's basketball